Zhu Hailun (born 1 January 1958) is a Chinese politician who is the current vice chairman of the Standing Committee of the People's Congress of Xinjiang Uygur Autonomous Region. Previously he served as the deputy party secretary of the Xinjiang Uyghur Autonomous Region. Between 2009 and 2016, Zhu was the party chief of Urumqi, the capital of the Xinjiang region.

Biography
Zhu, who is a member of China's ethnic Han majority, was born in Lianshui County, Jiangsu. In 1975, Zhu was sent to Kargilik County, Kashgar Prefecture, Xinjiang in the Down to the Countryside Movement. Zhu joined the Communist Party of China in May 1980. He attended school at the Xinjiang Party School. He served successively as the party chief of Kashgar (county-level city), deputy party chief and later party chief of Hotan. By the 1990s, he was fluent in the Uyghur language. In October 2006, he was named a member of the regional Party Standing Committee and the head of the regional Political and Legal Affairs Commission, an important post overseeing internal security and law enforcement. In September 2009, he was named party chief of Urumqi after months of unrest in the capital. In April 2016, he was named deputy party chief of Xinjiang. According to the International Consortium of Investigative Journalists (ICIJ), Zhu had a major role on the strategic planning of the Xinjiang internment camps.

On 9 July 2020, US Secretary of State Michael Pompeo announced that Zhu Hailun and his immediate family members were ineligible for entry into the United States due to Zhu's involvement in gross violations of human rights.

On 22 March 2021, Zhu was sanctioned by the European Union and the United Kingdom. The Council cited his involvement in the internment camps in Xinjiang, noting that "as Secretary of the Political and Legal Affairs Committee of the Xinjiang Autonomous Region (2016 to 2019), Zhu Hailun was responsible for maintaining internal security and law enforcement in the XUAR. As such, he held a key political position in charge of overseeing and implementing a large-scale surveillance, detention and indoctrination programme targeting Uyghurs and people from other Muslim ethnic minorities. Zhu Hailun has been described as the 'architect' of this programme. He is therefore responsible for serious human rights violations in China, in particular large-scale arbitrary detentions inflicted upon Uyghurs and people from other Muslim ethnic minorities." As a second reason for adding him to the sanctions list, the EU added that "as Deputy Head of the 13th People’s Congress of the XUAR (2019 to February 2021), Zhu Hailun continued to exercise a decisive influence in the XUAR where the large-scale surveillance, detention and indoctrination programme targeting Uyghurs and people from other Muslim ethnic minorities continues."

Zhu is also on the Canadian Consolidated Sanctions List.

See also 

 China Cables
 Uyghur Human Rights Policy Act

References

1958 births
Living people
People from Huai'an
Central Party School of the Chinese Communist Party alumni
People's Republic of China politicians from Jiangsu
Chinese Communist Party politicians from Jiangsu
Political office-holders in Xinjiang
Sent-down youths
People sanctioned under the Magnitsky Act
Chinese individuals subject to U.S. Department of the Treasury sanctions